Benito Juarez Community Academy, (commonly known as Juarez High School), is a public 4–year high school in the Pilsen neighborhood on the west side of Chicago, Illinois, United States. Juarez is named for Mexican president Benito Pablo Juárez García. The school is a part of the Chicago Public Schools (CPS) district. As of 2014 it is the largest high school in Pilsen. It was designed by architect Pedro Ramírez Vázquez.

The school was proposed to the Chicago Board of Education multiple times but ultimately rejected. This led to protests and boycotts from many Mexican students and families. Finally, in June 1974, the Chicago Board of Education approved $8.9 million in funding to build a high school in Pilsen. Benito Juarez Community Academy opened in 1977 and as of 2017 has a 94 percent Latino student body. The school is decorated with murals and statues that portray Mexican culture and famous leaders.

History
Prior to the opening of Juarez, Pilsen area students attended Carter Harrison Technical High School. The Pilsen community asked for a senior high school of their own since the students had to cross gang territory to get to Harrison. Other factors included racial tensions at Harrison itself and Pilsen parents worrying about their children getting into trouble away from their watch. A March 1972 boycott of two area schools, the Froebel branch of Harrison and Jirka School, from Mexican origin people gave impetus to have Juarez built.

Teresa Fraga, Mary Gonzales and Raquel Guerrero are the three founding mothers of Benito Juarez Community High School. Gonzales was the head of the Pilsen Neighbors group. In the late 1960s, the three mothers shared concerns for their own children when the only public high school available was Harrison High school. Harrison high school was located in a neighborhood plagued with gang territory and racial tension between African Americans and Mexican Americans. The mothers wanted a safe and conducive school for Spanish speaking students.

In June 1973 the Chicago Board of Education approved the construction of Juarez, and the board selected the location in September of that year. In June 1974, Chicago’s Board of Education approved $8.9 million in funding to build a high school in Pilsen. By September 1974, due to business owners wanting to increase the final payments made out to them from the loss of their businesses and factory workers who themselves were parents not wishing to lose their jobs, CPS had not yet begun construction of Juarez; this prompted area parents and students to protest and ask the workers and business owners to reconsider their stances. Additional boycotts and use of "freedom schools" instead of the regular public schools occurred. In 1975 CPS acquired the land and in 1976 it selected the architect.

The city closed Blue Island to prepare for the construction of the school. The contractors who had the school built were Mexican-American. Some University of Illinois Chicago students suggested naming the school after Emiliano Zapata, Che Guevara, or another revolutionary of Latin American origin, but the parents were opposed to that idea.

When the school opened, the faculty had originated from other Chicago schools. The formal dedication occurred on September 16, 1977. The CPS superintendent, Joseph Hannon, attended and stated that the Juarez school represented "a community that would not take 'no' for an answer." René Luis Alvarez, a professor at Northeastern Illinois University, stated that the school's establishment, "[i]n many ways", originated from the Chicano movement and its desire for greater recognition of Mexican-American history and identity.

The school was established in 1977. During the opening ceremony, a bust sculpture of Juárez and the flag of Mexico were presented, and the anthems of the United States and of Mexico were both played. The choice of the day of the ceremony was influenced by the fact that September 16 is the anniversary of the Cry of Dolores, the Mexican independence day, as well as near the beginning of the school year in Chicago. In its first year the school had grades 9-11, with 12th grade coming later.

By 1997 CPS officials were considering expanding Juarez since it became one of the most crowded community high schools in Chicago.

In December 2022, Brandon Perez, aged 15, and Nathan Billegas, aged  14, were killed by gunfire on school grounds following a dispute about their gang affiliation.

Campus
The school is located at Blue Island and Cermak avenues. The campus was designed by Mexican architect Pedro Ramírez Vázquez; it is centered around a three-story patio intended as a point of assembly for students and a community center, and the design features similar to Aztec pyramids were intended as an homage to Mexican culture.

The school includes "La Esperanza," a 1979 mural depicting the struggle for Mexican-American young people. It was professionally commissioned by mothers who had advocated for the construction of the school. The artists were Malú Ortega y Alberro, Jimmy Longoria, Oscar Moya, Marcos Raya, Robert Valadez, and Salvador Vega. Various other murals with Mexican nationalist and pre-Columbian motifs were painted by Mexican-American artists.

Juarez was expanded in 2010 to include a larger campus, an auditorium, and a soccer field. Technology is integrated, and there are ten modern computer labs.

Academics
Programs include Advanced Placement (AP) courses in Biology, Calculus, Chemistry, Chinese Language and Culture, Computer Science, English Language and Composition, English Literature, European History, Physics, Psychology, Spanish Language, Spanish Literature, Statistics, Studio Art–Drawing, Studio Art 2–D Design, U.S. Government/Politics and United States History.

The school offers a variety of curricular options, including: 
College Bound Licensed Practical Nursing
Project Lead the Way
Transportation Academy
Police and Firefighter Training Academy
TV Production
Work Experience Cooperative Education Program (WECEP)
Junior Reserve Officers' Training Corps (JROTC)

Athletics
Juarez competes in the Chicago Public League (CPL) and is a member of the Illinois High School Association (IHSA). The school's sport teams are nicknamed Eagles. Juarez boys' cross country were Class AA in 1995–96. The boys' soccer team were Public league champions in 1995–96, Class AA in 2007–08 and Class 2A in 2010–11.

See also

 Mexicans in Chicago
 Liceo Mexicano Japonés - A private school in Mexico City designed by Pedro Ramírez Vázquez

Notes

References
 Alvarez, René Luis. "A Community that Would Not Take 'No' for an Answer: Mexican Americans, the Chicago Public Schools, and the Founding of Benito Juarez High School," Journal of Illinois History (2014) 17:1 pp 78–98.

External links
 Official Website Of Benito Juarez High School

1977 establishments in Illinois
Educational institutions established in 1977
Lower West Side, Chicago
Mass shootings in Illinois
High school shootings in the United States
Mexican-American culture in Chicago
Public high schools in Chicago